Prashanthini is an Indian playback singer, singing predominantly in Tamil. She is the daughter of Malaysia Vasudevan and the sister of Yugendran.

Career
Prashanthini first began her playback career with Harris Jayaraj for the movie 12B. However, after this song, she took a long break and came back in the G. V. Prakash Kumar-composed film Veyyil. She became instantly famous after singing the song "Mundhinam Parthene" for the movie Varanam Aayiram, composed by Harris Jayaraj. Now, she is singing for many composers and hopes for long innings in playback singing without falling under her father's shadow. Her Ayyayo... (Aadukalam), Lolita... (Engeyum Kaadhal), Enge En Idhayam... (Kandaen) and Ennamo Yedho... (Ko), feature among the top 20 popular songs on FM radio. All the four numbers are melodies that have caught the imagination of the youth. In the world of film music, people are trying to track down this elusive singer with a sweet melodious voice.

Personal life
Prashanthini was born on 28 September 1983. She finished Bachelor of computer application. She got married Premnath in 2008 and she has a son named Rithvik. Coincidentally, the movie 12B in which she sang her debut song was released on her birthday.

Filmography

 All films are in Tamil, unless otherwise noted.

References

Indian women playback singers
Indian people of Malaysian descent
Living people
Tamil playback singers
Telugu playback singers
1983 births
Malayali people
21st-century Indian women singers
21st-century Indian singers